EDW may refer to:

 Edwards Air Force Base, California, U.S., IATA airport code EDW
 Edelweiss Air, a Swiss airline, ICAO airline designator EDW
 East Dulwich railway station, London, England, station code EDW
 El Dorado and Wesson Railway, a railway in Arkansas, U.S.
 Enterprise data warehouse, a data warehouse used in an enterprise
 European DataWarehouse, part of the ABS Loan Level Data initiative 
 Eendracht Doet Winnen, a Dutch football club, now part of WV-HEDW